Subnautica: Below Zero is an open-world survival action-adventure video game developed and published by Unknown Worlds Entertainment. It is the stand-alone expansion to the 2018 game Subnautica.

Introduced in early access via Steam and the Epic Games Store in January 2019, Subnautica: Below Zero was released for the macOS, Nintendo Switch, PlayStation 4, PlayStation 5, Windows, Xbox One, and Xbox Series X/S on May 14, 2021. The physical versions of the game are published by Bandai Namco Entertainment.

Gameplay 

Subnautica: Below Zero is a survival adventure game set in an open world environment and played from a first-person perspective. Like its predecessor, the player's goal is to explore the environments and survive in an alien environment while also completing objectives to advance the game's plot. Players collect resources, construct tools, build bases and submersibles, and can interact with the planet's wildlife.

To survive and complete objectives, player must collect raw materials from the environment and craft equipment, vehicles, shelters, and food. Each of these has its own recipe, and some ingredients can only be found in the far-flung and deeper corners of the game world. Habitat structures provide shelter, storage for equipment and collected materials, and crafting stations. Inside a habitat, the player can also craft living amenities such as beds or coffee tables, although these are purely cosmetic since the game does not track fatigue.

Each piece of equipment that can be crafted has its own recipe and the player begins the game knowing only a handful of recipes. The player learns new recipes by scanning scraps of technology or recovering databoxes, which are strewn across the game world. Alongside raw materials, finding new crafting recipes is a major reason to explore.

Generally, the game requires the player to visit ever-deeper sections of the game in order to find exotic materials, technology to scan, and complete objectives. In fact, the final objective of the game is located at the deepest point in the game world. The main issue with accessing deep sections of the water is oxygen capacity. At the start of the game, the player character can only hold her breath for 45 seconds and even less at depths below 100 m. The player must craft equipment that will allow them to stay underwater for longer, such as high-capacity oxygen tanks and vehicles. Habitats and vehicles provide oxygen while powered, but vehicles need to be upgraded in order to withstand the water pressure at greater depths.

The game primarily takes place underwater, but, unlike its predecessor, there are also expansive land-based areas to explore. There are explorable structures to find both above ground and underwater, which serve as key locations for the story, as well as sources of new blueprints used in crafting. In addition to the day-night cycle, there are dynamic weather effects, such as wind and fog, which further affect visibility. The game introduces new gadgets like the Headlamp, Mineral Detector, and Booster Tank.

Alongside returning mechanics such as oxygen, hunger, and thirst, players now have a body heat gauge which comes into play when walking on land. It functions much like the oxygen gauge does underwater. The player will gradually lose body heat and eventually die of hypothermia, unless they can replenish their body heat by jumping into water, consuming certain items or standing next to a heat source.

Upon beginning a new game, players must select a difficulty mode from the following four:

 Survival — The player must manage health, hunger, thirst, oxygen and temperature. Upon death, they respawn, but certain items are lost from their inventory. This is the "standard" game mode.
 Freedom Mode — Just like survival, but with hunger and thirst disabled.
 Hardcore Mode — Survival mode with permadeath.  If the player dies, the player will not respawn and their save file is deleted.
 Creative Mode — Health, hunger, thirst, oxygen and temperature are disabled, all the crafting blueprints are available at the start, and no resources are required to craft. Additionally, the submersibles, a Seaglide, mobile vehicle bay, knife, flashlight, habitat builder, scanner and a propulsion cannon are provided. They do not need an energy source and cannot be damaged (unless the player damages them intentionally).

Plot 
Two years after the events of the original game, scientist Robin Ayou smuggles herself onto planet 4546B in a frozen biome named "Sector Zero" in order to investigate the circumstances of her sister Samantha's death, which Alterra claims was a result of "employee negligence". During the past year, Alterra had built a number of research bases on the planet but had recently withdrawn all of its personnel, giving Robin an opportunity to land on the planet.

Shortly after landing, Robin picks up a distress signal and goes to investigate it, discovering an alien sanctuary containing the digitized consciousness of a living precursor. The alien introduces itself as Al-An and forcibly downloads itself into Robin's brain just as the sanctuary's power runs out. Angry at Al-An for intruding into her mind, Robin agrees to help it construct a new body for it to transfer into. In order to carry this out, Robin combs the planet for alien installations and artifacts to find the necessary components and materials. Al-An also explains that it did not try to contact Alterra because it believed Alterra's motivations did not align with its own, and it did not want to risk them finding a way to its homeworld. During their search, Al-An admits that it was one of the lead scientists researching a cure for the Kharaa bacterium and it disobeyed orders by trying to hatch Sea Dragon eggs, leading to the initial outbreak of Kharaa on 4546B.

Meanwhile, Robin also continues her investigation into Samantha's death. She searches all of the abandoned Alterra research facilities, and finds out that Alterra discovered the corpse of a leviathan frozen in ice that was still infected by Kharaa. However, instead of destroying the Kharaa, Alterra decided to start researching the bacterium for useful applications. Fearing another outbreak and concerned Alterra will use Kharaa to develop bioweapons, Samantha decided to sabotage the project by using explosives to collapse the cave holding the leviathan, while her friend, Degasi survivor Marguerit Maida, destroyed the lab holding Alterra's Kharaa samples. However, Samantha was inadvertently caught in the blast and killed by falling rubble. Unable to determine the cause of the cave in, Alterra wrote off Samantha's death as a result of negligence. In order to prevent Alterra returning to the planet to restart their research, Robin recovers a cache of antibacterial agent Samantha had made earlier and uses it to neutralize the Kharaa infecting the frozen leviathan.

Eventually, Robin is able to recover all of the components necessary to build a new body and fabricates it. Al-An transfers itself to the new body and decides to return to the precursor homeworld in order to see for itself what had happened to the other Architects, as well as to atone for its past mistakes. Al-An activates an Architect phase gate and Robin travels with Al-An to the precursor homeworld, uncertain of what they will find there.

Development
Subnautica: Below Zero was initially envisioned as a downloadable content (DLC) pack for the original Subnautica (2018), though its scope eventually expanded significantly, prompting Unknown Worlds to release Below Zero as a standalone product. Despite this, it was not considered to be a full sequel to Subnautica. Announced in August 2018, the game was released into early access for Windows and MacOS on January 30, 2019. The full game was released for these platforms, along with versions for Nintendo Switch, PlayStation 4, PlayStation 5, Xbox One and Xbox Series X/S, on May 14, 2021. The game has a larger emphasis on storytelling when compared with the original.

Reception 

Subnautica: Below Zero received "generally favorable reviews" according to Metacritic.

Notes

References

External links 
 

2021 video games
Action-adventure games
Bandai Namco games
Early access video games
Fiction set on ocean planets
MacOS games
Nintendo Switch games
Open-world video games
PlayStation 4 games
PlayStation 5 games
Scuba diving video games
Single-player video games
Survival video games
Unknown Worlds Entertainment games
Video game sequels
Video games developed in the United States
Video games featuring female protagonists
Video games set on fictional planets
Video games with underwater settings
Windows games
Xbox One games
Xbox Series X and Series S games